Brother Jean-Paul Desbiens, Frère Pierre-Jérôme, F.M.S., OC (March 7, 1927 – July 23, 2006) was a Quebec writer, journalist, teacher and member of the Catholic institute of  Marist Brothers.

He was born at Métabetchouan in the Lac Saint-Jean region of Quebec in 1927. He joined the Marist order in 1944 and studied at the Université de Montréal and the Université Laval, graduating with a degree in philosophy in 1958. He began a teaching career in high schools of his native Lac-St-Jean region.  His 1960 book Les insolences du Frère Untel (1960) (translated as The Impertinences of Brother Anonymous, 1962), is a strong attack on the quality of public education system in Quebec. The book, which also denounces the poor quality of the spoken and written French among the younger generations, is credited by many as inspiring the Quiet Revolution in Quebec. A follow-up, Sous le soleil de la pitié (translated as For Pity's Sake: The Return of Brother Anonymous, 1965) was published in 1965.

His identity revealed and his relationship with the church establishment strained, Desbiens left the Quebec intellectual scene and attended University of Fribourg, Switzerland, where he obtained a Ph.D in philosophy. He later worked with the Ministry of Education in Quebec to help  improve the public school and junior college programs in the province. Desbiens was chief editorial writer for La Presse from 1970 to 1972.  He was also the provincial head of his religious congregation for some time. He wrote many essays, and published his personal journal. He was named an Officer of the Order of Canada in 2006.

He died in Quebec City of a heart attack on July 23, 2006, after a long battle with lung cancer.

References
W. H. New, ed. Encyclopedia of Literature in Canada. Toronto: University of Toronto Press, 2002: 288.

External links 
Jean-Paul Desbiens (1927-2006) Homme d'Église, enseignant, écrivain (french)
Jean-Paul Desbiens entry in The Canadian Encyclopedia

1927 births
2006 deaths
Marist Brothers
Officers of the Order of Canada
People from Saguenay–Lac-Saint-Jean
Journalists from Quebec
Writers from Quebec
Université Laval alumni
Canadian writers in French